Umair (Bangla: উমাইর/উমায়ের ), also spelled Umaeir, Umaer, Umayer, Omair, Umayr, Umyr or Omayer  is an Arabic male given name, meaning one who is intelligent. The name is common in Bangladesh and Pakistan and the people of their origin.

Notable people

 Dhū al-Shamālayn ʿUmayr ibn ʿAbd ʿAmr al-Khuzāʿī, Meccan sahabi/companion of Prophet Muhammad 
 Mus’ab ibn Umayr (7th century CE), Sahabi - companion of the Prophet Muhammad
 Omair Rana, Pakistani actor and director 
 Umair Ali, Emirati cricketer 
Umair Haque, British economist
Umair Jawsal, Pakistani singer and actor 
Umair Khan (born 1985), Pakistani cricketer
 Umair Masood (born 1997), Pakistani cricketer
 Umair Mir, Pakistani cricketer
 Umair Zaman (born 1997), Pakistani squash player
 Umayr ibn Hashim, the father of Mus'ab ibn Umayr

References

Arabic masculine given names